Eric Walmsley Heath (born 23 November 1923) is a New Zealand artist, illustrator, and cartoonist.

Life and work 
Heath was born in Wellington and began his professional life working as an filing clerk for The Evening Post. He joined the Royal New Zealand Air Force during the Second World War and served with the Air Sea Rescue Catalina Squadron in the Solomon Islands.

After his military service Heath returned to working for The Evening Post, training as a photo engraver. Subsequent to this he worked as a freelance artist. In 1965, Heath had his first cartoon published in the Dominion newspaper. He was the editorial cartoonist for the Dominion from 1964 until 1993 and produced five cartoons a week for 28 years.

Eric also produced illustrations for commissioned or collaborative books covering diverse subject matter.

Hobbies 
Heath participated in scuba diving and helped establish the Wellington Underwater Club in 1951. He has also built stage sets for the Plimmerton Little Theatre group and replica bumboats.

Bibliography 
 Marine Fishes of New Zealand by Eric Heath and John M. Moreland. Bailey Bros and Swinfen. 1969.
Marine Fishes of New Zealand: Shoreline and Shallow Seas v. 1 (Mobil New Zealand nature series) by L. Paul and Eric Heath. Raupo Publishing (NZ) Ltd. 1997
Marine Fishes of New Zealand: Deeper Coastal and Ocean Waters v. 2 (Mobil New Zealand nature series) by L. Paul and Eric Heath. Raupo Publishing (NZ) Ltd. 1997
Seashore Life (Mobil New Zealand nature series) by Eric Heath and R.K. Dell. Raupo Publishing (NZ) Ltd. 1993
Classic Steam Locomotives of New Zealand Vol 1 by Bob Stott and Eric Heath. Grantham House Publishing. 1994.

References

New Zealand cartoonists
1923 births
Living people
New Zealand military personnel of World War II